PAF acetyltransferase may refer to:
 1-alkylglycerophosphocholine O-acetyltransferase
 Platelet-activating factor acetyltransferase